Big Significant Things is a 2014 American comedy-drama film written and directed by Bryan Reisberg and starring Harry Lloyd and Krista Kosonen.  It is Reisberg's directorial debut.

Cast
Harry Lloyd as Craig Harrison
Krista Kosonen as Ella
Sylvia Grace Crim as Grace
James Ricker II as Travis
Travis Koop as Grant
Elisabeth Gray	as Allison (voice)
Bess Baria as Sam
Kaitlynn Alford as Nicky
Samuel Foreman	as Constantine
William Foreman as John
Peter Cameron as Joel (voice)

Reception
The film has a 20% rating on Rotten Tomatoes.  Glenn Kenny of RogerEbert.com awarded the film two stars.  Carson Lund of Slant Magazine gave it one and a half stars out of four.

References

External links
 
 

American comedy-drama films
2014 films
2014 directorial debut films
2014 comedy-drama films
Films scored by Mark Orton
2010s English-language films
2010s American films